Em(m)anuel Löwy, or Emanuel Loewy (September 1, 1857 in Vienna – February 11, 1938 in Vienna) was a classical archaeologist and theorist who employed the methodology of universal psychological sources of form in his work.

Löwy was influenced by the concept of "das Gedächtnisbild" by Ernst Brücke.  Löwy was also a friend of the famous psychoanalyst Sigmund Freud.  Among his academic specialties was the art of ancient Greek vase painting.  

Löwy served as a professor of archaeology at the University of Rome (1891–1915) where he taught, among others, Giulio Giglioli.  Löwy was also professor of archaeology at the University of Vienna (1918–1938).

References
 Kleinbauer, W. Eugene.  Research Guide to the History of Western Art.  Sources of Information in the Humanities, no. 2.  Chicago:  American Library Association, 1982, pp. 95–6.
 Dvorák, Max.  Idealism and Naturalism in Gothic Art.  Translated and noted by Randolph J. Klawiter.  Preface by Karl Maria Swoboda.  Notre Dame, IN:  University of Notre Dame Press, 1967, pp. 211–12.
 Praschniker, C. "Emanuel Löwy." In Almanach der Österreichischen Akadamie der Wissenschaft 88 (1938); Bazin 318.
 Archäologenbildnisse: Porträts und Kurzbiographien von Klassichen Archäologen deutscher Sprache. Reinhard Lullies, ed. Mainz am Rhein: Verlag Philipp von Zabern, 1988: 120-121.

Bibliography
 Untersuchungen zur griechischen Künstlergeschichte. Vienna: Gerold's [sic] Sohn, 1883.
 "Inschriften griechischer Bildhauer" (1885);
 Griechische Inschrifttexte Vienna: Tempsky: 1888.
 Lysipp und seine Stellung in der griechischen Plastik Hamburg: Sammlung gemeinverständlicher wissenschafter Vorträge, 1891.
 Die Naturwiedergabe in der älteren griechischen Kunst Rome: Loescher, 1900.
 Die griechische Plastik. 2 vols. Leipzig: Klinkhardt und Biermann, 1911.
 Stein und Erz in der statuarischen Kunst. Innsbruck: Wagner, 1915.
 Neuattische Kunst. Leipzig: Seeman, 1922.
 Die Anfänge des Triumphbogens Vienna: Anton Schroll, 1928.
 Polygnot: Ein Buch von griechischer Malerei. 2 vols. Vienna: Anton Schroll, 1929.
 Ursprünge der bildenden Kunst. Vienna: Holder-Pilchler-Tempsky, 1930.
 Zur Chronologie der frühgriechischen Kunst: Die Artemistempel von Ephesos. Vienna: Holder-Pichler-Tempsky, 1932.
 "Der Beginn der rotfigurigen Vasenmalerei" (1938)

External links 
 Jewish Encyclopedia

Austrian archaeologists
Austrian classical scholars
Austrian Jews
Austrian expatriates in Italy
Scientists from Vienna
1857 births
1938 deaths
Burials at Döbling Cemetery
Classical archaeologists
Classical scholars of the University of Vienna
Classical scholars of the Sapienza University of Rome